Ibungilo is an Administrative Ward and the headquarter of the Ilemela District in Mwanza Region Tanzania. In 2016 the Tanzania National Bureau of Statistics report there were 30,950 people in the ward.

Villages 
The ward has 7 villages.

 Ibungilo A
 Ibungilo B
 Nyamanoro Kaskazini
 Nyamanoro C
 Kiloleli A
 Kiloleli B
 Nyamanoro B

References

Wards of Mwanza Region
Ilemela District
Constituencies of Tanzania